Rote Hand ('Red Hand') was a weekly newspaper published from Munich, Germany around 1918–1920. Politically, it voiced opposition to the Weimar republic and socialism. The newspaper belonged to a tendency that later became associated with National Socialism.

References

German-language newspapers
Weekly newspapers published in Germany
Newspapers published in Munich
Defunct newspapers published in Germany
Defunct weekly newspapers